Jupiter Ridge Natural Area is a  area of protected land in Jupiter, Florida, in Palm Beach County. It is located at 1800 South U.S. Highway 1. Habitats include Florida scrub, depression marsh, tidal swamp, and flatwoods.

References

Protected areas of Palm Beach County, Florida
Nature reserves in Florida
Jupiter, Florida